Zion Chapel may refer to:

Buildings
Zion Chapel, Chester
Zion Chapel, East Grinstead – now referred to as West Street Baptist Church
Zion Baptist Chapel, Llanelli
Zion Chapel, Newick
Zion Memorial Chapel (New Hamburg, New York) – now referred to as St. Nicholas-on-the-Hudson (New Hamburg, New York)

See also 
Seion Chapel, Cwmaman, Rhondda Cynon Taf, Wales
Bryn Seion Chapel, Trecynon, Rhondda Cynon Taf, Wales
Zionist churches